Andrew Heiton (3 April 1823 – 3 March 1894) was a Scottish architect. He designed several notable buildings in Scotland, mostly railway stations and country houses.

Early life
Heiton was born in Inchture, Perth and Kinross, the son of Andrew Heiton, another architect, and Janet Lorimer. He had at least one brother, the younger Thomas Arthur Heiton.

Career
Heiton served as an apprentice under his father, who had moved to Perth. He then worked with William Burn and David Bryce in Edinburgh, before returning to practice with his father in the mid-1840s. John Murray Robertson became their apprentice in the mid-19th century. The duo built or added to several railway stations, including that of Stirling and Perth. They also served as the Perth's City Architects from 1856, succeeding William Macdonald Mackenzie. Heiton Jr. continued alone after the death of his father on 8 August 1858.

He inherited Darnick estate, in the Scottish Borders, restoring its 16th-century tower.

Heiton was admitted as a Fellow of the Royal Institute of British Architects (FRIBA) on 23 June 1879, his proposers being John Honeyman, John Baird and James Salmon.

Notable works

Perth railway station (addition of a two-storey extension to the north of the main block, 1854)
Stirling railway station (1848)
Abbey Presbyterian Church, Dublin (1864)
Castelroy, Broughty Ferry (1867)
St Mary's Monastery, Kinnoull (1868)
Kinfauns Parish Church (1869; with John Murray Robertson)
Craigievar and Darnick (1870), Kinnoull
Greig Institute, Leven (1872)
Victoria Buildings, Perth (1872)
26 Tay Street, Perth (c. 1873)
Vogrie House, Midlothian (1875)
Station Hotel, Perth (1885)
St Andrew's Church, Perth (1885)
Fonab Castle, Perth and Kinross (1892)

Personal life
In 1870, Heiton's self-designed double villa, Craigievar and Darnick, on Perth's Kinnoull Terrace, was completed.

Death
Heiton died in Perth in 1894, aged 70. He is buried in Greyfriars Burial Ground, just off the city's Tay Street, where several of his works still stand. His headstone was one of several removed and restored in 2019.

His practice was taken on by his nephew Andrew Heiton Granger, who switched around his name to become Andrew Granger Heiton.

References

1823 births
1894 deaths
19th-century Scottish architects
Fellows of the Royal Institute of British Architects
Architects from Perth, Scotland